KHIO may refer to:

 The ICAO code for Hillsboro Airport in Hillsboro, Oregon, United States
 Kunsthøgskolen i Oslo (KHiO), the Oslo National Academy of the Arts